Sábados Felices (Happy Saturdays) is a Colombian comedy show that debuted in 1972. It has been produced by Caracol Televisión for its entire run on the air; from 1972 to 1998, when Caracol was a programadora, it aired on Cadena Uno. It has been hosted by Alfonso Lizarazo, Alí Humar, Jota Mario Valencia, Carlos Calero, Hernán Orjuela and Humberto Rodríguez.

History
It began in 1972 as Campeones de la risa, changing names in 1976 when Caracol for the first time gained the rights to its Saturday timeslot.

After the licitación of 1997, Caracol did not receive any timeslots on Saturdays. This meant that Caracol's signature Saturday programs were presented for the first seven months of 1998 under the auspices of other programadoras; Sábados Felices was presented by Coestrellas, CPS and Proyectamos Televisión. The 1998 move of Caracol from a programadora to a private television channel, after 1,323 episodes had been aired, marked a format change for the program.

In 2016, it received the Guinness World Record for the world's oldest comedy show.

Blackface

The show has been criticised for the blackface character Soldado Micolta.

See also 
 Caracol TV

References

External links 
 Caracol Televisión
 Sábados Felices at Caracol International

1972 Colombian television series debuts
1970s Colombian television series
1980s Colombian television series
1990s Colombian television series
2000s Colombian television series
2010s Colombian television series
2020s Colombian television series
Spanish-language television shows
Blackface theatre